Éric Christian Bertrand (born April 16, 1975) is a Canadian professional ice hockey player who is currently playing for Saint-Georges Cool FM 103.5 in the Ligue Nord-Américaine de Hockey. He previously appeared in 15 games in the National Hockey League.

Playing career
Bertrand was drafted 207th overall in the eighth round by the New Jersey Devils in the 1994 NHL Entry Draft and as well as the Devils, he played for the Atlanta Thrashers and the Montreal Canadiens. He moved to Europe in 2001, playing for the Bracknell Bees in the British Ice Hockey Superleague, but played just eight games for them before moving to Germany's Deutsche Eishockey Liga where he played for the Kölner Haie. He returned to North America with a spell in the American Hockey League for the Hershey Bears before returning to the DEL to play for the Krefeld Pinguine.

He then moved to the Ligue Nord-Americaine de Hockey to play for the Saint-Georges Garaga where he scored 101 points (43 goals and 58 assists) in just 57 games, only Claude Morin (108) scored more points for the team. He once again moved to Germany, this time playing for the Kassel Huskies. He currently plays in the Oddset Ligaen in Denmark for SønderjyskE and won a bronze medal with this team in 2006–07, a bronze medal in 2007–08 and a gold medal in 2008–09.

Career statistics

Regular season and playoffs

External links
 

1975 births
SønderjyskE Ishockey players
Albany River Rats players
Atlanta Thrashers players
Bracknell Bees players
Canadian ice hockey left wingers
Granby Bisons players
Hershey Bears players
Ice hockey people from Quebec
Kassel Huskies players
Kölner Haie players
Krefeld Pinguine players
Living people
Milwaukee Admirals (IHL) players
Montreal Canadiens players
New Jersey Devils draft picks
New Jersey Devils players
People from Chaudière-Appalaches
Philadelphia Phantoms players
Quebec Citadelles players
Canadian expatriate ice hockey players in England
Canadian expatriate ice hockey players in Denmark
Canadian expatriate ice hockey players in Germany